Kenneth Noel Patrick Moran (c. 1919 – 13 June 1946) was a New Zealand boxer. He won the bronze medal in the men's featherweight division at the 1938 British Empire Games.

He served in the 2nd New Zealand Expeditionary Force during World War II, and in 1942 was taken as a prisoner of war in 1942. He died in Dunedin, Otago and was buried Hillsborough Cemetery, Auckland.

References

Boxers at the 1938 British Empire Games
Commonwealth Games bronze medallists for New Zealand
1910s births
1946 deaths
Burials at Hillsborough Cemetery, Auckland
New Zealand male boxers
Commonwealth Games medallists in boxing
Featherweight boxers
New Zealand military personnel of World War II
New Zealand prisoners of war in World War II
World War II prisoners of war held by Germany
Medallists at the 1938 British Empire Games